Zgornji Leskovec is a settlement in the upper valley of Lipnica Creek, a minor tributary of the Drava River, in the Municipality of Videm in eastern Slovenia. The area traditionally belonged to the Styria region. It is now included in the Drava Statistical Region.

The parish church in the village is dedicated to Saint Andrew and belongs to the Roman Catholic Archdiocese of Maribor. The parish is known as Sveti Andraž v Halozah. The church was built in 1545.

References

External links
Zgornji Leskovec on Geopedia

Populated places in the Municipality of Videm